Henry Agard Wallace (October 7, 1888 – November 18, 1965) was an American politician, journalist, farmer, and businessman who served as the 33rd vice president of the United States under President Franklin D. Roosevelt. He served as the 11th U.S. Secretary of Agriculture and the 10th U.S. Secretary of Commerce. He was the nominee of the new Progressive Party in the 1948 presidential election.

The oldest son of Henry C. Wallace, who served as U.S. Secretary of Agriculture from 1921 to 1924, Henry A. Wallace was born in rural Iowa in 1888. After graduating from Iowa State University in 1910, he worked as a writer and editor for his family's farm journal, Wallaces' Farmer. He also founded the Hi-Bred Corn Company, a hybrid corn company that became extremely successful. Wallace displayed intellectual curiosity about a wide array of subjects, including statistics and economics, and explored various religious and spiritual movements, including Theosophy. After his father's death in 1924, Wallace drifted away from the Republican Party; he supported Democratic nominee Franklin D. Roosevelt in the 1932 presidential election.

Wallace served as Secretary of Agriculture under Roosevelt from 1933 to 1940. He strongly supported the New Deal and presided over a major shift in federal agricultural policy, implementing measures designed to curtail agricultural surpluses and to ameliorate rural poverty. Roosevelt overcame strong opposition from conservative leaders in the Democratic Party and had Wallace nominated for vice president at the 1940 Democratic National Convention. The Roosevelt-Wallace ticket won the 1940 presidential election. At the 1944 Democratic National Convention, conservative party leaders defeated Wallace's bid for renomination, placing Missouri Senator Harry S. Truman on the Democratic ticket instead. In early 1945, Roosevelt appointed Wallace as Secretary of Commerce.

Roosevelt died in April 1945 and Truman succeeded him as president. Wallace continued to serve as Secretary of Commerce until September 1946, when he was fired by Truman for delivering a speech urging conciliatory policies toward the Soviet Union. Wallace and his supporters then established the nationwide Progressive Party and launched a third-party campaign for president. The Progressive platform called for conciliatory policies toward the USSR, desegregation of public schools, racial and gender equality, a national health-insurance program, and other left-wing policies. Accusations of Communist influence followed, and Wallace's association with controversial Theosophist figure Nicholas Roerich undermined his campaign; he received just 2.4% of the popular vote. Wallace broke with the Progressive Party in 1950 over the Korean War, and in a 1952 article he called the Soviet Union "utterly evil". Turning his attention back to agricultural innovation, he became a highly successful businessman. He specialized in developing and marketing hybrid seed corn and improved chickens before his death in 1965 of amyotrophic lateral sclerosis (ALS).

Early life and education

Henry Agard Wallace was born on October 7, 1888, on a farm near Orient, Iowa, to Henry Cantwell Wallace and his wife, May. Wallace had two younger brothers and three younger sisters. His paternal grandfather, "Uncle Henry" Wallace, was a prominent landowner, newspaper editor, Republican activist, and Social Gospel advocate in Adair County, Iowa. Uncle Henry's father, John Wallace, was an Ulster-Scots immigrant from the village Kilrea in County Londonderry, Ireland, who arrived in Philadelphia in 1823. May (née Broadhead) was born in New York City but was raised by an aunt in Muscatine, Iowa, after her parents' death.

Wallace's family moved to Ames, Iowa, in 1892 and to Des Moines, Iowa, in 1896. In 1894, the Wallaces established an agricultural newspaper, Wallace's Farmer. It became extremely successful and made the family wealthy and politically influential. Wallace took a strong interest in agriculture and plants from a young age and befriended African-American botanist George Washington Carver, with whom he frequently discussed plants and other subjects. Wallace was particularly interested in corn, Iowa's key crop. In 1904, he devised an experiment that disproved agronomist Perry Greeley Holden's assertion that the most aesthetically pleasing corn would produce the greatest yield. Wallace graduated from West High School in 1906 and enrolled in Iowa State College later that year, majoring in animal husbandry. He joined the Hawkeye Club, a fraternal organization, and spent much of his free time continuing to study corn. He also organized a political club to support Gifford Pinchot, a Progressive Republican who was head of the United States Forest Service.

Journalist and farmer

Wallace became a full-time writer and editor for Wallace's Farmer after graduating from college in 1910. He was deeply interested in using mathematics and economics in agriculture and learned calculus as part of an effort to understand hog prices. He also wrote an influential article with pioneering statistician George W. Snedecor on computational methods for correlations and regressions. After his grandfather died in 1916, Wallace and his father became the coeditors of Wallace's Farmer. In 1921, Wallace assumed leadership of the paper after his father accepted an appointment as Secretary of Agriculture under President Warren G. Harding. His uncle lost ownership of the paper in 1932 during the Great Depression, and Wallace stopped serving as editor in 1933.

In 1914, Wallace and his wife purchased a farm near Johnston, Iowa; they initially attempted to combine corn production with dairy farming, but later turned their full attention to corn. Influenced by Edward Murray East, Wallace focused on producing hybrid corn, developing a variety called Copper Cross. In 1923, he reached the first-ever contract for hybrid seed production, agreeing to grant the Iowa Seed Company the sole right to grow and sell Copper Cross corn. In 1926, he co-founded the Hi-Bred Corn Company to develop and produce hybrid corn. It initially turned only a small profit, but eventually became a massive financial success.

Early political involvement

During World War I, Wallace and his father helped the United States Food Administration (USFA) develop policies to increase hog production. After USFA director Herbert Hoover abandoned the hog production policies the Wallaces favored, the elder Wallace joined an effort to deny Hoover the presidential nomination at the 1920 Republican National Convention. Partly in response to Hoover, Wallace published Agricultural Prices, in which he advocated government policies to control agricultural prices. He also warned farmers of an imminent price collapse after the war. Wallace's prediction proved accurate: a farm crisis extended into the 1920s. Reflecting a broader decrease in agricultural prices, the corn prices fell from $1.68 per bushel in 1918 to $0.42 per bushel in 1921. Wallace proposed various remedies to combat the farm crisis, which he believed stemmed primarily from overproduction. Among his proposed policies was the "ever-normal granary": the government buys and stores agricultural surpluses when agricultural prices are low and sells them when they are high.

Both Wallaces backed the McNary–Haugen Farm Relief Bill, which would have required the federal government to market and export agricultural surpluses in foreign markets. The bill was defeated in large part because of the opposition of President Calvin Coolidge, who became president after Harding's death in 1923. Wallace's father died in October 1924, and in the November 1924 presidential election, Henry Wallace voted for the Progressive nominee, Robert La Follette. Due, in part, to Wallace's continued lobbying, Congress passed the McNary–Haugen bill in 1927 and 1928, but Coolidge vetoed the bill both times. Dissatisfied with both major party candidates in the 1928 presidential election, Wallace tried to get Illinois Governor Frank Lowden to run for president. He ultimately supported Democratic nominee Al Smith, but Hoover won a landslide victory. The onset of the Great Depression during Hoover's administration devastated Iowa farmers as farm income fell by two-thirds from 1929 to 1932. In the 1932 presidential election, Wallace campaigned for Democrat Franklin D. Roosevelt, who favored the agricultural policies of Wallace and economist M. L. Wilson. He did not formally register as a Democrat until 1936.

Secretary of Agriculture

After Roosevelt won the 1932 presidential election, he appointed Wallace as secretary of agriculture. Despite his past affiliation with the Republican Party, Wallace strongly supported Roosevelt and his New Deal domestic program, and became a registered member of the Democratic Party in 1936. Upon taking office, Wallace appointed Rexford Tugwell, a member of Roosevelt's "Brain Trust" of important advisers, as his deputy secretary. Though Roosevelt was initially focused primarily on addressing the banking crisis, Wallace and Tugwell convinced him of the necessity of quickly passing major agricultural reforms. Roosevelt, Wallace, and House Agriculture Committee Chairman John Marvin Jones rallied congressional support around the Agricultural Adjustment Act, which established the Agricultural Adjustment Administration (AAA). The AAA's aim was to raise prices for commodities through artificial scarcity by using a system of "domestic allotments" that set the total output of agricultural products. It paid land owners subsidies to leave some of their land idle. Farm income increased significantly in the first three years of the New Deal, as prices for commodities rose. After the Agricultural Adjustment Act passed, Agriculture became the federal government's largest department.

The Supreme Court struck down the Agricultural Adjustment Act in the 1936 case United States v. Butler. Wallace strongly disagreed with the Court's holding that agriculture was a "purely local activity" and thus could not be regulated by the federal government, saying, "were agriculture truly a local matter in 1936, as the Supreme Court says it is, half of the people of the United States would quickly starve." He quickly proposed a new agriculture program designed to satisfy the Supreme Court's objections; under the new program, the federal government would reach rental agreements with farmers to plant green manure rather than crops like corn and wheat. Less than two months after the Supreme Court decided United States v. Butler, Roosevelt signed the Soil Conservation and Domestic Allotment Act of 1936 into law. In the 1936 presidential election, Wallace was an important surrogate in Roosevelt's campaign.

In 1935, Wallace fired general counsel Jerome Frank and some other Agriculture Department officials who sought to help Southern sharecroppers by issuing a reinterpretation of the Agricultural Adjustment Act. He became more committed to aiding sharecroppers and other groups of impoverished farmers during a trip to the South in late 1936, after which he wrote, "I have never seen among the peasantry of Europe poverty so abject as that which exists in this favorable cotton year in the great cotton states." He helped lead passage of the Bankhead–Jones Farm Tenant Act of 1937, which authorized the federal government to issue loans to tenant farmers so that they could purchase land and equipment. The law also established the Farm Security Administration, which was charged with ameliorating rural poverty, within the Agriculture Department. The failure of Roosevelt's Judicial Procedures Reform Bill of 1937 (the "court-packing plan"), the onset of the Recession of 1937–38, and a wave of strikes led by John L. Lewis badly damaged the Roosevelt administration's ability to pass major legislation after 1936. Nonetheless, Wallace helped lead passage of the Agricultural Adjustment Act of 1938, which implemented Wallace's ever-normal granary plan. Between 1932 and 1940, the Agriculture Department grew from 40,000 employees and an annual budget of $280 million to 146,000 employees and an annual budget of $1.5 billion.

A Republican wave in the 1938 elections effectively brought an end to the New Deal legislative program, and the Roosevelt administration increasingly focused on foreign policy. Unlike many Midwestern progressives, Wallace supported internationalist policies, such as Secretary of State Cordell Hull's efforts to lower tariffs. He joined Roosevelt in attacking the aggressive actions of Nazi Germany and the Empire of Japan, and in one speech derided Nazi eugenics as a "mumbo-jumbo of dangerous nonsense." After World War II broke out in September 1939, Wallace supported Roosevelt's program of military buildup and, anticipating hostilities with Germany, pushed for initiatives like a synthetic rubber program and closer trade relations with Latin American countries.

Vice presidency (1941–1945)

Election of 1940

As Roosevelt refused to commit to either retiring or seeking reelection during his second term, supporters of Wallace and other leading Democrats such as Vice President John Nance Garner and Postmaster General James Farley laid the groundwork for a presidential campaign in the 1940 election. After the outbreak of World War II in Europe in September 1939, Wallace publicly endorsed a third term for Roosevelt. Though Roosevelt never declared his candidacy, the 1940 Democratic National Convention nominated him for president. Shortly after being nominated, Roosevelt told party leaders that he insisted on Wallace for vice president. A recent convert to the Democratic Party, Wallace was not popular among its leaders and had never been tested in an election. But he had a strong base of support among farmers, had been a loyal lieutenant to Roosevelt in domestic and foreign policy, and was in good health. Roosevelt convinced James F. Byrnes, Paul V. McNutt, and other contenders for the vice-presidential nomination to support Wallace, but conservative Democrats rallied around the candidacy of Speaker of the House William B. Bankhead. Eventually, Wallace won the nomination by a wide margin.

Though many Democrats were disappointed by Wallace's nomination, it was generally well received by newspapers. Arthur Krock of The New York Times wrote that Wallace was "able, thoughtful, honorable–the best of the New Deal type." Wallace left office as Secretary of Agriculture in September 1940, and was succeeded by Undersecretary of Agriculture Claude R. Wickard. The Roosevelt campaign settled on a strategy of keeping Roosevelt largely out of the fray of the election, leaving most of the campaigning to Wallace and other surrogates. Wallace was dispatched to the Midwest, giving speeches in states like Iowa, Illinois, and Missouri. He made foreign affairs the main focus of his campaigning, telling one audience that "the replacement of Roosevelt ... would cause [Adolf] Hitler to rejoice." Both campaigns predicted a close election, but Roosevelt won 449 of the 531 electoral votes and the popular vote by nearly ten points. After the election, Wallace toured Mexico as a goodwill ambassador, delivering a well-received speech regarding Pan-Americanism and Roosevelt's Good Neighbor policy. Upon his return, Wallace convinced the Rockefeller Foundation to establish an agricultural experiment center in Mexico, the first of many such centers the Rockefeller Foundation and the Ford Foundation established.

Tenure

Wallace was sworn in as vice president on January 20, 1941. He quickly grew frustrated with his ceremonial role as the presiding officer of the United States Senate, the one duty the Constitution assigns the vice president. In July 1941, Roosevelt named Wallace chairman of the Board of Economic Warfare (BEW) and of the Supply Priorities and Allocations Board (SPAB). These appointments gave him a voice in organizing national mobilization for war. One journalist noted that Roosevelt made Wallace the first "Vice President to work really as the number two man in government–a conception of the vice presidency popularly held but never realized." Reflecting Wallace's role in organizing mobilization efforts, many journalists began calling him the "Assistant President." Wallace was also named to the Top Policy Group, which advised Roosevelt on the development of nuclear weapons, an initiative Wallace supported. He did not hold any official role in the subsequent Manhattan Project, which developed the first nuclear weapons, but he was informed of its progress.

Economic conditions became chaotic, and Roosevelt decided new leadership was needed. In early 1942 he established the War Production Board with businessman Donald Nelson in charge as Wallace became a minor member of the War Production Board. He continued to serve as head of the BEW, which was now far less important: it was now charged with importing the raw materials such as rubber necessary for war production. Wallace struggled to carve out authority for the BEW, demanding that American purchases in Latin America raise the standard of living of the workers. In the process he clashed privately with Secretary of State Cordell Hull, who opposed American interference in another state's internal affairs. The national media dramatically covered Wallace's public battle with Jesse H. Jones, the Secretary of Commerce who was also in charge of the Reconstruction Finance Corporation (RFC), which paid the purchases bills BEW made. Roosevelt's standard strategy for executive management was to give two different people the same role, expecting controversy would result. He wanted the agencies' heads to bring the controversy to him so he could make the decision. On August 21, 1942, Roosevelt explicitly wrote to all his department heads that disagreements "should not be publicly aired, but are to be submitted to me by the appropriate heads of the conflicting agencies." Anyone going public had to resign. Wallace denounced Jones for blocking funding for purchases of raw materials in Latin America needed for the war effort. Jones called on Congress and the public for help, calling Wallace a liar. According to James MacGregor Burns, Jones, a leader of Southern conservative Democrats, was "taciturn, shrewd, practical, cautious". Wallace, deeply distrusted by Democratic party leaders, was the "hero of the Lib Labs, dreamy, utopian, even mystical, yet with his own bent for management and power." On July 15, 1943, Roosevelt stripped both men of their roles in the matter. BEW was reorganized as the Office of Economic Warfare, and put under Leo Crowley. The loss of the BEW was a major blow to Wallace's prestige. He now had no agency and a weak political base on the left wing of the Democratic Party. But he still had visibility, ambition and an articulate voice, and remained a loyal Roosevelt supporter. He was not renominated for vice president but in 1945 Roosevelt fired Jones and made Wallace Secretary of Commerce.

On May 8, 1942, Wallace delivered what became his best-remembered speech, known for containing the phrase "the Century of the Common Man". He cast World War II as a war between a "free world" and a "slave world," and held that "peace must mean a better standard of living for the common man, not merely in the United States and England, but also in India, Russia, China, and Latin America–not merely in the United Nations, but also in Germany and Italy and Japan". Some conservatives disliked the speech, but it was translated into 20 languages and millions of copies were distributed around the world.

In early 1943, Wallace was dispatched on a goodwill tour of Latin America; he made 24 stops across Central America and South America. Partly due to his ability to deliver speeches in Spanish, Wallace received a warm reception; one State Department official said, "never in Chilean history has any foreigner ever been received with such extravagance and evidently sincere enthusiasm". During his trip, several Latin American countries declared war against Germany. Back home, Wallace continued to deliver speeches, saying after the Detroit race riot of 1943, "we cannot fight to crush Nazi brutality abroad and condone race riots at home". Though Congress largely blocked Roosevelt's domestic agenda, Wallace continued to call for progressive programs; one newspaper wrote that "the New Deal today is Henry Wallace ... the New Deal banner in his hands is not yet furled".

In mid-1944, Wallace toured the Soviet Union and China. The USSR presented its American guests with a fully sanitized version of labor camps in Magadan and Kolyma, claiming that all the workers were volunteers. Wallace was impressed by the camp at Magadan, describing it as a "combination Tennessee Valley Authority and Hudson's Bay Company". He received a warm reception in the Soviet Union, but was largely unsuccessful in his efforts to negotiate with Chinese leader Chiang Kai-shek.

Election of 1944

After the abolition of the BEW, speculation began as to whether Roosevelt would drop Wallace from the ticket in the 1944 election. Gallup polling published in March 1944 showed that Wallace was clearly the most popular choice for vice president among Democrats, and many journalists predicted that he would win renomination. As Roosevelt was in declining health, party leaders expected that the party's vice-presidential nominee would eventually succeed Roosevelt, and Wallace's many enemies within the Democratic Party organized to ensure his removal. Much of the opposition to Wallace stemmed from his open denunciation of racial segregation in the South, but others were concerned by Wallace's unorthodox religious views and pro-Soviet statements. Shortly before the 1944 Democratic National Convention, party leaders such as Robert E. Hannegan and Edwin W. Pauley convinced Roosevelt to sign a document expressing support for either Associate Justice William O. Douglas or Senator Harry S. Truman for the vice-presidential nomination. Nonetheless, Wallace got Roosevelt to send a public letter to the convention chairman in which he wrote, "I personally would vote for [Wallace's] renomination if I were a delegate to the convention".

With Roosevelt not committed to keeping or dropping Wallace, the vice-presidential balloting turned into a battle between those who favored Wallace and those who favored Truman. Wallace did not have an effective organization to support his candidacy, though allies like Calvin Benham Baldwin, Claude Pepper, and Joseph F. Guffey pressed for him. Truman, meanwhile, was reluctant to put forward his own candidacy, but Hannegan and Roosevelt convinced him to run. At the convention, Wallace galvanized supporters with a well-received speech in which he lauded Roosevelt and argued that "the future belongs to those who go down the line unswervingly for the liberal principles of both political democracy and economic democracy regardless of race, color, or religion". After Roosevelt delivered his acceptance speech, the crowd began chanting for the nomination of Wallace, but Samuel D. Jackson adjourned the convention for the day before Wallace supporters could call for the beginning of vice presidential balloting. Party leaders worked furiously to line up support for Truman overnight, but Wallace received 429 1/2 votes (589 were needed for nomination) on the first ballot for vice president and Truman 319 1/2, with the rest going to various favorite son candidates. On the second ballot, many delegates who had voted for favorite sons shifted into Truman's camp, giving him the nomination.

On January 20, 1945, Wallace swore in Truman as his vice-presidential successor.

Secretary of Commerce (1945–1946)

Wallace believed that Democratic party leaders had unfairly stolen the vice-presidential nomination from him, but he supported Roosevelt in the 1944 presidential election. Hoping to mend ties with Wallace, Roosevelt offered him any position in the Cabinet other than secretary of state, and Wallace asked to replace Jones as secretary of commerce. In that position, Wallace expected to play a key role in the economy's postwar transition. In January 1945, with the end of Wallace's vice presidency, Roosevelt nominated Wallace for secretary of commerce. The nomination prompted an intense debate, as many senators objected to his support for liberal policies designed to boost wages and employment. Conservatives failed to block the nomination, but Senator Walter F. George led passage of a measure removing the Reconstruction Finance Corporation from the Commerce Department. After Roosevelt signed George's bill, Wallace was confirmed by a vote of 56 to 32 on March 1, 1945.

Roosevelt died on April 12, 1945, and was succeeded by Truman. Truman quickly replaced most other senior Roosevelt appointees, but retained Wallace, who remained very popular with liberal Democrats. The discontent of liberal leaders strengthened Wallace's position in the Cabinet; Truman privately stated that the two most important members of his "political team" were Wallace and Eleanor Roosevelt. As secretary of commerce, Wallace advocated a "middle course" between the planned economy of the Soviet Union and the laissez-faire economics that had dominated the United States before the Great Depression. With his congressional allies, he led passage of the Employment Act of 1946. Conservatives blocked the inclusion of a measure providing for full employment, but the act established the Council of Economic Advisers and the Joint Economic Committee to study economic matters. Wallace's proposal to establish international control over nuclear weapons was not adopted, but he did help pass the Atomic Energy Act of 1946, which established the United States Atomic Energy Commission to oversee domestic development of nuclear power.

World War II ended in September 1945 with the Surrender of Japan, and relations with the USSR became a central matter of foreign policy. Various issues, including the fate of European and Asian postwar governments and the administration of the United Nations, had already begun to strain the wartime alliance between the Soviet Union and the United States. Critics of the USSR objected to the oppressive satellite states it had established in Eastern Europe and Soviet involvement in the Greek Civil War and the Chinese Civil War. In February 1946, George F. Kennan laid out the doctrine of containment, which called for the United States to resist the spread of Communism. Wallace feared that confrontational policies toward the Soviet Union would eventually lead to war, and urged Truman to "allay any reasonable Russian grounds for fear, suspicion, and distrust". Historian Tony Judt wrote in Postwar that Wallace's "distaste for American involvement with Britain and Europe was widely shared across the political spectrum".

Though Wallace was dissatisfied with Truman's increasingly confrontational policies toward the Soviet Union, he remained an integral part of Truman's Cabinet during the first half of 1946. He broke with administration policies in September 1946 when he delivered a speech in which he stated that "we should recognize that we have no more business in the political affairs of Eastern Europe than Russia has in the political affairs of Latin America, Western Europe and the United States". Wallace's speech was booed by the pro-Soviet crowd he delivered it to and even more strongly criticized by Truman administration officials and leading Republicans like Robert A. Taft and Arthur Vandenberg. Truman stated that Wallace's speech did not represent administration policy but merely Wallace's personal views, and on September 20 he demanded and received Wallace's resignation.

1948 presidential election

Shortly after leaving office, Wallace became the editor of The New Republic, a progressive magazine. He also helped establish the Progressive Citizens of America (PCA), a progressive political organization that called for good relations with the Soviet Union and more liberal programs at home. Though not a member of the PCA, Wallace was widely regarded as the organization's leader and was criticized for the PCA's acceptance of Communist members. In response to the creation of the PCA, anti-Communist liberals established a rival group, Americans for Democratic Action (ADA), which explicitly rejected any association with Communism. Wallace strongly criticized the president in early 1947 after Truman promulgated the Truman Doctrine to oppose Communist threats to Greece and Turkey. Wallace also opposed Truman's Executive Order 9835, which began a purge of government workers affiliated Communist groups deemed to be subversive. He initially favored the Marshall Plan, but later opposed it because he believed the program should have been administered through the United Nations. Wallace and the PCA were scrutinized by the FBI and the House Un-American Activities Committee, both of which sought to uncover evidence of Communist influence.

Many in the PCA favored the establishment of a third party, but other longtime Wallace allies warned him against leaving the Democratic Party. On December 29, 1947, Wallace launched a third party campaign, declaring, "we have assembled a Gideon's Army, small in number, powerful in conviction ... We face the future unfettered, unfettered by any principal but the general welfare". He was backed by many Hollywood and Broadway celebrities, and intellectuals. Among his prominent supporters were Rexford Tugwell, Congressmen Vito Marcantonio and Leo Isacson, musicians Paul Robeson and Pete Seeger, and future presidential nominee George McGovern. Calvin Baldwin became Wallace's campaign manager and took charge of fundraising and ensuring that Wallace appeared on as many state ballots as possible. Wallace's first choice for running mate, Claude Pepper, refused to leave the Democratic Party, but Democratic Senator Glen H. Taylor of Idaho agreed to serve as Wallace's running mate. Wallace accepted the endorsement of the American Communist Party, stating, "I'm not following their line. If they want to follow my line, I say God bless 'em". Truman responded to Wallace's left-wing challenge by pressing for liberal domestic policies, while pro-ADA liberals like Hubert Humphrey, Robert F. Wagner, and James Roosevelt linked Wallace to the Soviet Union and the Communist Party. Many Americans came to see Wallace as a fellow traveler to Communists, a view that was reinforced by Wallace's refusal to condemn the 1948 Czechoslovak coup d'état. In early 1948, the CIO and the AFL both rejected Wallace, with the AFL denouncing him as a "front, spokesman, and apologist for the Communist Party". With Wallace's foreign policy views overshadowing his domestic policy views, many liberals who had previously favored his candidacy returned to the Democratic fold.

Wallace embarked on a nationwide speaking tour to support his candidacy, encountering resistance in both the North and South. He openly defied the Jim Crow regime in the South, refusing to speak before segregated audiences. Time magazine, which opposed Wallace's candidacy, described him as "ostentatiously" riding through the towns and cities of the segregated South "with his Negro secretary beside him". A barrage of eggs and tomatoes were hurled at Wallace and struck him and his campaign members during the tour. State authorities in Virginia sidestepped enforcing their own segregation laws by declaring Wallace's campaign gatherings private parties. The Pittsburgh Press began publishing the names of known Wallace supporters. Scores of Wallace supporters in colleges and high schools lost their positions. 

With strong financial support from Anita McCormick Blaine, Wallace exceeded fundraising goals, and appeared on the ballot of every state except for Oklahoma, Nebraska, and Illinois. The campaign distributed 25 million copies of 140 fliers and pamphlets. Nevertheless, Gallup polls showed support for Wallace falling from 7% in December 1947 to 5% in June 1948. He was endorsed by only two newspapers: the Communist Daily Worker in New York and The Gazette and Daily in York, Pennsylvania. Some in the press began to speculate that Wallace would drop out of the race.  

Wallace's supporters held a national convention in Philadelphia in July, formally establishing a new Progressive Party. The party platform addressed a wide array of issues, and included support for the desegregation of public schools, gender equality, a national health insurance program, free trade, and public ownership of large banks, railroads, and power utilities. Another part of the platform stated, "responsibility for ending the tragic prospect of war is a joint responsibility of the Soviet Union and the United States". During the convention, Wallace faced questioning regarding letters he had written to guru Nicholas Roerich; his refusal to comment on the letters was widely criticized. Wallace was further damaged days after the convention when Whittaker Chambers and Elizabeth Bentley testified before the House Un-American Activities Committee that several government officials associated with Wallace (including Alger Hiss and John Abt) were Communist infiltrators. Meanwhile, many Southern Democrats, outraged by the Democratic Party's pro-civil rights plank, bolted the party and nominated Strom Thurmond for president. With the Democrats badly divided, Republicans were confident that Republican nominee Thomas Dewey would win the election. Wallace himself predicted that Truman would be "the worst defeated candidate in history".

Though polls consistently showed him losing the race, Truman ran an effective campaign against Dewey and the conservative 80th United States Congress. He ultimately defeated Dewey in both the popular and electoral vote. Wallace won just 2.38 percent of the nationwide popular vote, and failed to carry any state. His best performance was in New York, where he won eight percent of the vote. Just one of the party's congressional candidates, incumbent Congressman Vito Marcantonio, won election. Though Wallace and Thurmond probably took many voters from Truman, their presence in the race may have boosted the president's overall appeal by casting him as the candidate of the center-left. In response to the election results, Wallace stated, "Unless this bi-partisan foreign policy of high prices and war is promptly reversed, I predict that the Progressive Party will rapidly grow into the dominant party. ... To save the peace of the world the Progressive Party is more needed than ever before".

Historians Edward Schapsmeier and Frederick Schapsmeier argue:The Progressive party stood for one thing and Wallace another. Actually the party organization was controlled from the outset by those representing the radical left and not liberalism per se. This made it extremely easy for Communists and fellow travelers to infiltrate into important positions within the party machinery. Once this happened, party stands began to resemble a party line. Campaign literature, speech materials, and campaign slogans sounded strangely like echoes of what Moscow wanted to hear. As if wearing moral blinkers, Wallace increasingly became an imperceptive ideologue. Words were uttered by Wallace that did not sound like him, and his performance took on a strange Jekyll and Hyde quality—one moment he was a peace protagonist and the next a propaganda parrot for the Kremlin.

Later politics

Wallace initially remained active in politics following the 1948 campaign, and he delivered the keynote address at the 1950 Progressive National Convention. In early 1949, Wallace testified before Congress in the hope of preventing the ratification of the North Atlantic Treaty, which established the NATO alliance between the United States, Canada, and several European countries. He became increasingly critical of the Soviet Union after 1948, and he resigned from the Progressive Party in August 1950 due to his support for the UN intervention in the Korean War. After leaving the Progressive Party, Wallace endured what biographers John Culver and John Hyde describe as a "long, slow decline into obscurity marked by a certain acceptance of his outcast status".

In the early 1950s, he spent much of his time rebutting attacks by prominent public figures like General Leslie Groves, who claimed to have stopped providing Wallace with information regarding the Manhattan Project because he considered Wallace to be a security risk. In 1951, Wallace appeared before Congress to deny accusations that in 1944 he had encouraged a coalition between Chiang Kai-shek and the Chinese Communists. In 1952, he published an article, "Where I Was Wrong," in which he repudiated his earlier foreign policy positions and declared the Soviet Union to be "utterly evil".
Wallace did not endorse a candidate in the 1952 presidential election, but in the 1956 presidential election he endorsed incumbent Republican President Dwight D. Eisenhower over Democratic nominee Adlai Stevenson. Wallace, who maintained a correspondence with Eisenhower, described Eisenhower as "utterly sincere" in his efforts for peace. Wallace also began a correspondence with Vice President Richard Nixon, but he declined to endorse either Nixon or Democratic nominee John F. Kennedy in the 1960 presidential election. Though Wallace criticized Kennedy's farm policy during the 1960 campaign, Kennedy invited Wallace to his 1961 inauguration, the first presidential inauguration Wallace had attended since 1945. Wallace later wrote Kennedy, "at no time in our history have so many tens of millions of people been so completely enthusiastic about an inaugural address as about yours". In 1962, he delivered a speech commemorating the centennial anniversary of the establishment of the Department of Agriculture. He also began a correspondence with President Lyndon B. Johnson regarding methods to alleviate rural poverty, though privately he criticized Johnson's escalation of American involvement in the Vietnam War. In the 1964 election, Wallace returned to the Democratic fold, supporting Johnson over Republican nominee Barry Goldwater. Due to declining health, he made his last public appearance that year; in one of his last speeches, he stated, "We lost Cuba in 1959 not only because of Castro but also because we failed to understand the needs of the farmer in the back country of Cuba from 1920 onward. ... The common man is on the march, but it is up to the uncommon men of education and insight to lead that march constructively".

Business success 

Wallace continued to co-own and take an interest in the company he had established, Pioneer Hi-Bred (formerly the Hi-Bred Corn Company), and he established an experimental farm at his New York estate. He focused much of his efforts on the study of chickens, and Pioneer Hi-Bred's chickens at one point produced three-quarters of all commercially sold eggs worldwide. He also wrote or co-wrote several works on agriculture, including a book on the history of corn.

Illness and death

Wallace was diagnosed with amyotrophic lateral sclerosis (ALS) in 1964, at the age of 76. He consulted numerous specialists and tried various methods of treating the disease, stating, "I look on myself as an ALS guinea-pig, willing to try almost anything". He died in Danbury, Connecticut, on November 18, 1965, at the age of 77. His remains were cremated and the ashes interred in Glendale Cemetery in Des Moines, Iowa. Due to his successful business career and investments, he left an estate valued at tens of millions of dollars.

Family

In 1913, Wallace met Ilo Browne, the daughter of a successful businessman from Indianola, Iowa. Wallace and Browne married on May 20, 1914, and had three children. Henry Browne was born in 1915, Robert Browne was born in 1918, and Jean Browne was born in 1920. Wallace and his family lived in Des Moines until Wallace accepted appointment as secretary of agriculture, at which point they began living in an apartment at Wardman Park in Washington, D.C. In 1945, Wallace and his wife purchased a 115-acre farm near South Salem, New York known as Farvue. Ilo was supportive of her husband's career and enjoyed serving as Second Lady of the United States from 1941 to 1945, though she was uncomfortable with many of Wallace's Progressive supporters during his 1948 presidential campaign. Wallace and Ilo remained married until his death in 1965; she lived until 1981. In 1999, Wallace's three children sold their shares in Pioneer Hi-Bred to DuPont for well over $1 billion. Wallace's grandson, Scott Wallace, won the Democratic nomination for Pennsylvania's 1st congressional district in the 2018 elections. He was defeated by Republican incumbent, Brian Fitzpatrick, in the general election.

Mysticism and Roerich controversy

Wallace was raised a Calvinist but showed an interest in other religious teachings during his life. He was deeply interested in religion from a young age, reading works by authors like Ralph Waldo Emerson, Ralph Waldo Trine, and William James, whose The Varieties of Religious Experience had a particularly strong impact on Wallace. After his grandfather's death in 1916, he left the Presbyterian Church and became increasingly interested in mysticism. He later said, "I know I am often called a mystic, and in the years following my leaving the United Presbyterian Church I was probably a practical mystic…  I'd say I was a mystic in the sense that George Washington Carver was – who believed God was in everything and therefore, if you went to God, you could find the answers". Wallace began regularly attending meetings of the pantheistic Theosophical Society, and, in 1925, he helped organize the Des Moines parish of the Liberal Catholic Church. Wallace left the Liberal Catholic Church in 1930 and joined the Episcopal Church, but he continued to be interested in various mystic groups and individuals.

Among those who Wallace corresponded with were author George William Russell, astrologer L. Edward Johndro, and Edward Roos, who took on the persona of a Native American medicine man. In the early 1930s, Wallace began corresponding with Nicholas Roerich, a prominent Russian émigré, artist, peace activist, and Theosophist. With Wallace's support, Roerich was appointed to lead a federal expedition to the Gobi Desert to collect drought-resistant grasses. Roerich's expedition ended in a public fiasco, and Roerich fled to India after the Internal Revenue Service launched a tax investigation.

The letters that Wallace wrote to Roerich from 1933 to 1934 were eventually acquired by Republican newspaper publisher Paul Block.  The Republicans threatened to reveal to the public what they characterized as Wallace's bizarre religious beliefs before the November 1940 elections but were deterred when the Democrats countered by threatening to release information about Republican candidate Wendell Willkie's rumored extramarital affair with the writer Irita Van Doren. The contents of the letters did become public seven years later, in the winter of 1947, when right-wing columnist Westbrook Pegler published what were purported to be extracts from them as evidence that Wallace was a "messianic fumbler", and "off-center mentally". During the 1948 campaign Pegler and other hostile reporters, including H. L. Mencken, aggressively confronted Wallace on the subject at a public meeting in Philadelphia in July. Wallace declined to comment, accusing the reporters of being Pegler's stooges. Many press outlets were critical of Wallace's association with Roerich; one newspaper mockingly wrote that if Wallace became president "we shall get in tune with the Infinite, vibrate in the correct plane, outstare the Evil Eye, reform the witches, overcome all malicious spells and ascend the high road to health and happiness".

Henry Wallace reportedly dabbled in Zoroastrianism and Buddhism.

Legacy

During his time in the Roosevelt administration, Wallace became a controversial figure, attracting a mix of praise and criticism for various actions. He remains a controversial figure today. Historian Arthur M. Schlesinger Jr. pronounced Wallace to be both "an incorrigibly naive politician" and "the best secretary of agriculture the country has ever had". Journalist Peter Beinart writes that Wallace's "naive faith in U.S.-Soviet cooperation" damaged his legacy. Historian Andrew Seal lauds Wallace for his focus on combating both economic and racial inequality. Wallace's vision of the "Century of the Common Man," which denied American exceptionalism in foreign policy, continues to influence the foreign policy of individuals like Bernie Sanders. In 2013, historian Thomas W. Devine wrote that "newly available Soviet sources do confirm Wallace's position that Moscow's behavior was not as relentlessly aggressive as many believed at the time". Yet Devine also writes that "enough new information has come to light to cast serious doubt both on Wallace's benign attitude toward Stalin's intentions and on his dark, conspiratorial view of the Truman administration".

Alex Ross of The New Yorker writes, "with the exception of Al Gore, Wallace remains the most famous almost-president in American history". Journalist Jeff Greenfield writes that the 1944 Democratic National Convention was one of the most important political events of the twentieth century, since the leading contenders for the nomination might have governed in vastly different ways. In The Untold History of the United States, Oliver Stone argues that, had Wallace become president in 1945, "there might have been no atomic bombings, no nuclear arms race, and no Cold War". By contrast, Ron Capshaw of the conservative National Review argues that a President Wallace would have practiced a policy of appeasement that would have allowed the spread of Communism into countries like Iran, Greece, and Italy.

The Henry A. Wallace Beltsville Agricultural Research Center in Beltsville, Maryland, the largest agricultural research complex in the world, is named for him. Wallace founded the Wallace Genetic Foundation to support agricultural research. His son, Robert, founded the Wallace Global Fund to support sustainable development. A speech Wallace delivered in 1942 inspired Aaron Copland to compose Fanfare for the Common Man. The Franklin D. Roosevelt Presidential Library and Museum's grounds in Hyde Park, New York, include the Henry A. Wallace Visitor and Education Center at its north end.

Books
 Agricultural Prices (1920)
 Corn and Corn-Growing with E. N. Bressman (1923)
 When to feed corn, when to sell it (1923)
 Correlation and machine calculation with George W. Snedecor (1925)
 New administration and farm relief (1933)
 America must choose (1934)
 Charted course toward stable prosperity (1934)
 New frontiers (1934)
 Research and adjustment march together (1934)
 Statesmanship and religion (1934)
 Working together in the corn-hog program (1934)
 Cooperation: the dominant economic idea of the future (1936)
 Whose Constitution?  An inquiry into the general welfare (1936)
 Technology, corporations, and the general welfare (1937)
 Paths to plenty (1938)
 American choice (1940)
 Price of freedom (1940)
 Preço da liberdade (1942)
 Pan American friendship (1941)
 ¿Que hara Norteamérica? (1941)
 Después de la guerra debe comenzar el siglo del hombre del pueblo (1942)
 Price of free world victory (1942)
 Precio de la victoria (1942)
 Why did God make America? (1942)
 America's part in world reconstruction (1943)
 Century of the Common Man (1943)
 Century of the common man (UK) (1944)
 Christian bases of world order (1943)
 Discursos pronunciados en Lima (1943)
 Ideales comunes (1943)
 New world theme: The price of free world victory (1943)
 Democracy first: What we fight for (1944)
 Our job in the Pacific (1944)
 Sixty million jobs (1945)
 Arbeit für sechzig Millionen Menschen (1946)
 Ocupación para sesenta millones (1946)
 Lavoro per tutti (1946)
 Hua-lai-shih ti hu shêng (1947)
 Era del popolo (1946)
 Fight for peace (1946)
 Soviet Asia mission Andrew J. Steiger (1946)
 Ma mission en Asie soviétique (1947)
 Sondermission in Sowjet-Asien und China (1947)
 Misiya v Savetska Aziya (1948)
 Toward world peace (1948)
 Naar wereldvrede (1948)
 Vers la paix (1948)

See also

 History of left-wing politics in the United States
 Honeydew (melon), apparently first introduced to China by H. A. Wallace and still known there as the "Wallace melon"
 Bailan melon, one of the most famous Chinese melon cultivars, bred from the "Wallace melon"

Notes

References

Sources

 
 ; online review

Further reading

Secondary sources

 Busch, Andrew E. "Last Gasp: Henry A. Wallace and the End of the Popular Front." (2014) 42#4: 712-717. online

 
 
 
 
 Hamby, Alonzo L. "Sixty Million Jobs and the People's Revolution: The Liberals, the New Deal, and World War II." Historian 30.4 (1968): 578-598.online

 
 Janeway, Eliot. The Struggle for Survival: A Chronicle of Economic Mobilization in World War II (Yale University Press. 1951). online

 

 Leebaert,  Derek. Unlikely Heroes: Franklin Roosevelt, His Four Lieutenants, and the World They Made (2023); on Perkins, Ickes, Wallace and Hopkins.

 Lord, Russell (1947). The Wallaces of Iowa. Houghton-Mifflin. A Life-in-America prize book. .
 ; ridicules and debunks Wallace. online
 
 
 
 
 Shimamoto, Mayako (2016). Henry A. Wallace's Criticism of America's Atomic Monopoly, 1945-1948. Cambridge Scholars Publishing. .
 Schapsmeier, Edward L., and Frederick H. Schapsmeier. "Henry A. Wallace: Agrarian Idealist or Agricultural Realist?" Agricultural History 41.2 (1967): 127-138 online.
 Schapsmeier, Edward L. and Frederick H. Schapsmeier. "Henry A Wallace: New Deal Philosopher." Historian 32.2 (1970): 177-190. online

 

 Timmons, Bascom N. Jesse H. Jones, the man and the statesman (1951) online ch 29 on feud with Wallace.
  online
 Walton, Richard J. Henry Wallace, Harry Truman, and the Cold War (1976) online

Bibliography: Works by Wallace

Books

 Agricultural Prices (1920)
 Corn and Growing Corn (1937), with Earl N. Bressman.
 When to Feed Corn, When to Sell It (1923)
 New Administration and Farm Relief (1933)
 Charted Course Toward Stable Prosperity (1934)
 New Frontiers (1934)
 America Must Choose (1934)
 Statesmanship and Religion (1934)
 Whose Constitution? An Inquiry Into the General Welfare (1936)
 The Century of the Common Man (1943) Illustrations by Hugo Gellert. Foreword by Carl Sandburg.
Hugo Gellert created a series of twenty silk screen prints to be used as artwork. The original prints are now in the digital collection at the Whitney Museum of American Art.
 Democracy Reborn (1944)
 Sixty Million Jobs (1945)
 Soviet Asia Mission (1946)
 Toward World Peace (1948)
 Where I Was Wrong (1952)
 The Price of Vision: The Diary of Henry A. Wallace 1942–1946 (1973), edited by John Morton Blum.

Articles and essays
 "Correlation and Machine Calculation." with George W. Snedecor. Iowa State College of Agriculture and Mechanic Arts. Official Publication, Vol. 23, No. 35, January 28, 1925.
 "American Agriculture and World Markets." Foreign Affairs, Vol. 12, No. 2, January 1934 pp. pp. 216–230. . .
 "The World Cotton Drama." Foreign Affairs, Vol. 13, No. 4, July 1935, pp. 543–556. . .

Pamphlets
 Cooperation: The Dominant Economic Idea of the Future. New York: Cooperative League (1936). . 16 p.

Book contributions
 Foreword to A Pasture Handbook. U.S. Department of Agriculture (April 1934).
 Introduction to Brant, Irving. Storm Over the Constitution: Democracy Turns to Federalism, by Irving Brant. Bobbs-Merrill (1936).
 Foreword to America's "Thought Police": Record of the Un-American Activities Commission. Civil Rights Congress (October 1947).

Published addresses
 Agricultural Price Outlook (1923).
 An address to the 28th annual meeting of the Illinois Farmers' Institute in Belleville, Illinois, on February 21, 1923. Published by the Illinois Farmers' Institute.
 Working Together in the Corn-hog Program (1934)
 "Remarks by Hon. H.A. Wallace, Secretary of Agriculture, delivered in the Department of Agriculture period of the National Farm and Home Hour, broadcast by 50 associate N.B.C. radio stations, Thursday, May 10, 1934."
 The Dairyman's Place in Farm Solidarity (1937)
 "Adapted in the Division of Information from an address by Henry A. Wallace, Secretary of Agriculture, before the annual meeting of the National Cooperative Milk Producers' Federation at Baltimore, Md., November 2, 1931."
 Technology, Corporations, and the General Welfare (1937)
Speech delivered on June 24, 1937. Published by the University of North Carolina Press.
 An American Income for Cotton (1938)
 "Adapted from an address by Henry A. Wallace, Secretary of Agriculture, before a meeting of farmers, A.A.A. committeemen, and others, at Fort Worth, Texas, September 30, 1938." 
 An American Income for Wheat (1938)
 The Century of the Common Man (1942)
 "A speech delivered May 8, 1942 articulating the goals of the war for the allies."
 The Price of Free World Victory (1942)
 "An address delivered May 8, 1942 to the members and guests of the Free World Association at a dinner at the Hotel Commodore in New York. Published in collaboration with the Free World Movement."
 The Century of the Common Man (1942)
 A speech delivered November 8, 1942 at the Congress of American-Soviet Friendship Mass Meeting in New York. He further expanded on the subject since his delivery of a similar speech earlier that year.
 America Tomorrow (1943)
 An address delivered July 25, 1943 at the Mass Meeting of Labor and Civic Organizations in Detroit, Michigan.

External links

 
 The Wallace Global Fund
 Works by Henry A. Wallace at The Online Books Page
 Selected works by Henry A. Wallace at The New Deal Network
 As delivered transcript and complete audio of Wallace's 1942 "The Century of the Common Man" Address
 Henry A. Wallace Collection (digitized) at University of Iowa Library
 Searchable index of Wallace papers at the Library of Congress, Franklin D. Roosevelt Library, and the University of Iowa
 "Henry A. Wallace – Agricultural Pioneer, Visionary and Leader", Iowa Pathways, education site of Iowa Public Television
 "The Life of Henry A. Wallace: 1888–1965", on website of The Wallace Center for Agricultural and Environmental Policy at Winrock International
 
 
 "Is There Any 'Wallace' Left in the Democratic Party?" , The Real News (TRNN). Scott Wallace, grandson of Henry A. Wallace, interviewed by Paul Jay (video).
 FBI file on Henry Wallace
 The Country Life Center location of The Wallace Centers of Iowa: birthplace farm of Henry A. Wallace. Museum and gardens.

|-

|-

|-

|-

|-

1888 births
1965 deaths
20th-century vice presidents of the United States
American Episcopalians
American horticulturists
American Labor Party politicians
American political party founders
American social democrats
American Presbyterians
American people of Scotch-Irish descent
Burials in Iowa
Converts to Anglicanism from Presbyterianism
Neurological disease deaths in Connecticut
Deaths from motor neuron disease
Democratic Party vice presidents of the United States
Democratic Party (United States) vice presidential nominees
Farmers from New York (state)
Franklin D. Roosevelt administration cabinet members
Iowa Democrats
People from Adair County, Iowa
Politicians from Danbury, Connecticut
People from South Salem, New York
People from Winterset, Iowa
Politicians from Des Moines, Iowa
Progressive Party (United States, 1948) politicians
Truman administration cabinet members
Candidates in the 1948 United States presidential election
United States Secretaries of Agriculture
United States Secretaries of Commerce
1940 United States vice-presidential candidates
1944 United States vice-presidential candidates
Vice presidents of the United States
Wallace family of Iowa
Activists for African-American civil rights
Left-wing populism in the United States
Progressivism in the United States